Mikhail Leonidovich Agranovich (born 1946) is a Soviet and Russian cinematographer, director and teacher. He became an Honored Artist of the RSFSR (1987).

Biography
Mikhail Agranovich was born on September 8, 1946, in Moscow. His father, Leonid Agranovich, was also a director. Mikhail Agranovich graduated from VGIK in 1970, the workshop of Alexander Halperin. Since 1975, he has worked at the Mosfilm studio as an operator.

He has credits on more than thirty films, and has worked with leading names in Soviet cinema such as Mikhail Schweitzer, Tengiz Abuladze and Gleb Panfilov. In 1995 he made the film Za co? with the Polish director Jerzy Kawalerowicz. Mikhail Agranovich has repeatedly been awarded professional prizes and awards; his films Repentance  and  Mother  received special prizes of the jury of the Cannes Film Festival.

In 2000 he directed Come Look at Me, together with Oleg Yankovsky.

Agranovich teaches at VGIK. He directs the workshop at the camera faculty. Since 2015, he has been head of the department of camera skills in VGIK.

In 2011,  Agranovich was the chairman of the jury at the festival   in Vyborg.

Personal life

Agranovich's first marriage was to Emilia Kulik, the announcer of the All-Union Radio. They had a son, Alexey, born in 1970, who is also now a director.

Agranovich's second marriage was to Lidiya Fedoseyeva-Shukshina.

His third marriage, to the director and documentary screenwriter Alla Agranovich, produced a daughter Maria (born 1989). In 2010, Maria graduated from the Directing Department of VGIK. In 2011, her debut film No problem won the prize for young filmmakers  at the contest Kinotavr  Short Meter.

Selected filmography
Cinematographer
 Tryn-trava (1976)
 Little Tragedies  (1979)
 Look for a Woman (1983)
 Snake Catcher (1985)
 Repentance (1987)
 Mother (1990)
 Za co? (1995)
 The Romanovs: An Imperial Family (2000)
 Come Look at Me (2001)
 The First Circle (2006)
Grandfather of My Dreams (2014)
 Ivan Denisovich (2021)
Director
 Come Look at Me (2001)

Awards 
 Nika Award (1988)
 Vasilyev Brothers State Prize of the RSFSR (1989)
 TEFI  (2006)

References

External links
 

1946 births
Living people
Mass media people from Moscow
Soviet cinematographers
Russian cinematographers
Russian film directors
Recipients of the Vasilyev Brothers State Prize of the RSFSR
Recipients of the Nika Award
Gerasimov Institute of Cinematography alumni
Academic staff of the Gerasimov Institute of Cinematography